The 2nd Critics' Choice Real TV Awards, presented by the Broadcast Television Journalists Association and NPACT, which recognizes excellence in nonfiction, unscripted and reality programming across broadcast, cable and streaming platforms, were held on June 29, 2020. The nominations were announced on June 8, 2020.

Winners and nominees
Winners are listed first and highlighted in bold:

Programs

Personality

Achievement

Most major nominations
Programs that received multiple nominations are listed below, by number of nominations per work and per network:

Most major wins

References

2020 television awards
2020 in American television
 002